Tayuman station is a former railway station located on the South Main Line of the Philippine National Railways (PNR).
It served as a temporary station in 1994 when the historic Tutuban station was being converted into a mall and while the new Tutuban station Executive Building in Mayhaligue Street is being built.

Philippine National Railways stations
Railway stations in Metro Manila
Former buildings and structures in Manila
Buildings and structures in Tondo, Manila
Defunct railway stations